Katharine E. Hamnett  (born 16 August 1947, in Gravesend, Kent) is an English fashion designer best known for her political T-shirts.

Early life 
Hamnett was born on 16 August 1947, the daughter of James Appleton, a group captain. She attended Cheltenham Ladies’ College.

Career
Hamnett graduated from Saint Martin's School of Art. She set up Tuttabankem with Anne Buck in 1969. From 1975, she was a freelance fashion designer in London, Paris, Milan, New York and Hong Kong until she founded the Katharine E. Hamnett clothes label in 1979.

Media exposure
Hamnett's oversized T-shirts with large block letter slogans, launched in 1983, were adopted by pop bands, including Wham!. George Michael wore his white "CHOOSE LIFE" shirt in the music video for "Wake Me Up Before You Go-Go". The t-shirt also appeared in Queen's video for "Hammer to Fall" (worn by Roger Taylor). Taylor wore Hamnett's  "WORLDWIDE NUCLEAR BAN NOW" shirt during Queen's historic appearance at the first edition of the Rock in Rio festival in Rio de Janeiro, Brazil.

In 1984, ZTT's Paul Morley designed a series of "FRANKIE SAY..." T-shirts to promote the record label's chart act Frankie Goes to Hollywood (FGTH). Morley has stated that these designs were consciously based on Hamnett's slogan T-shirts: "What persuaded me was reading Katharine Hamnett saying she wanted the T-shirts ripped off, which reminded me of Mark P, saying he wanted Sniffin' Glue to be ripped off. And I mean, I did a fanzine, so when I read that I thought, great, fanzine T-shirts!" The official FGTH designs were particularly successful, and spawned many imitations of their own.

Models such as Naomi Campbell have appeared in Hamnett shirts bearing the slogans "USE A CONDOM" and "PEACE".

Hamnett viewed her T-shirts as a way of getting her message across: "If you want to get the message out there, you should print it in giant letters on a t-shirt." Her first shirt featured the  "CHOOSE LIFE" slogan. Inspired by a Buddhist exhibit, it was a comment against war, death and destruction. Hamnett has spoken out several times against the slogan's use by anti-abortion activists in the U.S. She wrote on her website, "It's not about the anti-abortion lobby. The US anti-abortion lobby attempted to appropriate CHOOSE LIFE. We are taking it back and promoting its real meaning. Ours is authentic and I believe in a woman's right to choose."

In 2015, Hamnett designed a T-shirt reading CHOOSE LOVE for the charity Help Refugees (which is now known as Choose Love).

Outside her own label, in 1984 Hamnett was involved in the founding of Tanya Sarne's Ghost label.

Political activism
Beginning in 1989, with research showing pesticide poisoning in cotton-growing regions, and sweatshop labour a major part of the textiles industry, Hamnett began lobbying for major changes in the way the industry operated. After disappointment with the results, Hamnett terminated most of her licensing arrangements, and in 2005 relaunched her line under stricter ethical guidelines, including manufacturing and agricultural practices.

At one point, Hamnett met with then-Prime Minister Margaret Thatcher wearing her own T-shirt with the slogan "58% DON'T WANT PERSHING", a reference to polls showing public opposition in the United Kingdom against the basing of Pershing II missiles in the country. In 2003, at a London fashion show, Hamnett's catwalk models wore shirts with "STOP WAR, BLAIR OUT", a reference to the looming invasion of Iraq.

In 2008, Hamnett said that fashion designers participating in the London Fashion Week were racist due to what she views as increasing exclusion of black models, stating:

In 2013, Hamnett designed two different T-shirts for the Campaign for Nuclear Disarmament: "EDUCATION NOT TRIDENT" and "NHS NOT TRIDENT". As an additional sign of her commitment to the anti-nuclear cause, Hamnett joined the 55th edition of the Easter demonstration at Aldermaston, on 1 April 2013.

Hamnett was one of several celebrities who endorsed the parliamentary candidacy of the Green Party's Caroline Lucas at the 2015 general election.

Monsanto
In June 2014, Hamnett joined Nimrod Kamer to perform a stunt outside Hackney Town Hall, aiming to make Hackney Mayor Jules Pipe ban the weedkiller Monsanto Roundup being used in the borough.

Awards and honours
Hamnett won the first ever British Fashion Awards, and in 1996, was voted Britain's favourite designer by readers of Cosmopolitan. Hamnett was appointed Commander of the Order of the British Empire (CBE) in the 2011 New Year Honours, for services to the fashion industry.

References

External links

1947 births
Living people
English fashion designers
British women fashion designers
People from Gravesend, Kent
Commanders of the Order of the British Empire
Alumni of Saint Martin's School of Art
1980s fashion
People educated at Cheltenham Ladies' College